The 2020–21 The Citadel Bulldogs basketball team represented The Citadel, The Military College of South Carolina in the 2020–21 NCAA Division I men's basketball season. The Bulldogs, led by sixth-year head coach Duggar Baucom, played their home games at McAlister Field House in Charleston, South Carolina, as members of the Southern Conference.

Previous season
The Bulldogs finished the 2019–20 season 6–24, 0–18 in SoCon play to finish in last place. They lost in the first round of the SoCon tournament to Wofford.

Roster

Schedule and results

|-
!colspan=12 style=| Non-conference regular season

|-
!colspan=12 style=| SoCon regular season

|-
!colspan=12 style=| SoCon tournament
|-

|-

Source

References

The Citadel Bulldogs basketball seasons
Citadel Bulldogs
Citadel Bulldogs basketball
Citadel Bulldogs basketball